Warfield is a home rule-class city in Martin County, Kentucky, United States. The population was 269 at the 2010 census.

History

The city of Warfield developed in the early 1850s after a salt works was established by George Rogers Clark Floyd and John Warfield of Virginia. The post office was established on April 15, 1856 and was named after the latter of the two men. Floyd further developed the city as the shipping point for his coal mine, the first to open in future Martin County. Warfield served as the county seat from 1870 to 1873, when it was moved to Inez.

Geography
Warfield is located at  (37.842799, -82.420766). The town lies along the west bank of the Tug Fork, which is the boundary between Kentucky and West Virginia.  The town of Kermit, West Virginia, lies across the river to the east.  The two cities are connected by a vehicular bridge and an abandoned railroad bridge.  Just west of Warfield lies the community of Beauty.

Warfield is concentrated around the intersection of Kentucky Route 40 and Kentucky Route 292.  KY 40 connects Warfield with Inez and Paintsville to the west. KY 292 runs roughly north to south alongside the Tug Fork.

Demographics

As of the census of 2000, there were 284 people, 120 households, and 78 families residing in the city. The racial makeup of the city was 100.00% White. Hispanic or Latino of any race were 0.35% of the population.

There were 120 households, out of which 20.0% had children under the age of 18 living with them, 51.7% were married couples living together, 10.8% had a female householder with no husband present, and 34.2% were non-families. 30.8% of all households were made up of individuals, and 15.0% had someone living alone who was 65 years of age or older. The average household size was 2.37 and the average family size was 2.96.

In the city, the population was spread out, with 20.4% under the age of 18, 10.6% from 18 to 24, 28.9% from 25 to 44, 26.1% from 45 to 64, and 14.1% who were 65 years of age or older. The median age was 41 years. For every 100 females, there were 98.6 males. For every 100 females age 18 and over, there were 83.7 males.

The median income for a household in the city was $21,786, and the median income for a family was $30,000. Males had a median income of $33,125 versus $38,125 for females. The per capita income for the city was $12,208. About 28.9% of families and 35.4% of the population were below the poverty line, including 54.4% of those under the age of eighteen and 12.0% of those 65 or over.

See also

Martin County School System

References

External links

Martin County Schools

Cities in Martin County, Kentucky
Cities in Kentucky
Populated places established in 1982
Coal towns in Kentucky
1982 establishments in Kentucky